Omidyar Network is a self-styled "philanthropic investment firm," composed of a foundation and an impact investment firm.  Established in 2004 by eBay founder Pierre Omidyar and his wife Pam, Omidyar Network has committed over US$1.5billion to nonprofit organizations and for-profit companies across multiple investment areas. According to the OECD, Omidyar Network's financing for 2019 development increased by 10% to US$58.9 million.

Structure
Composed of a 501(c)(3) and a Limited Liability Company (LLC), Omidyar Network is structured to work across the social, business, and government sectors. Like a traditional foundation, it makes grants through its 501(c)(3) entity; through its LLC, it invests in for-profit entities. It is a part of The Omidyar Group.

In 2018, Omidyar Network spun off its Governance & Citizen Engagement initiative. The group now operates as Luminate, a global philanthropic organization that invests in Civic Empowerment, Data & Digital Rights, Financial Transparency, and Independent Media. It is led by Stephen King.

In 2019, Omidyar Network spun off its Financial Inclusion initiative. The group now operates as Flourish and is led by Tilman Ehrbeck, Arjuna Costa, and Emmalyn Shaw.

People
As of 2022, the CEO of Omidyar Network is Mike Kubzansky. Its board of directors include the managing directors of The Omidyar Group, Jeff Alvord and Pat Christen.

As of 2022, the organization has offices in Silicon Valley, Bengaluru, London, Mumbai, Nairobi, and Washington, D.C.

Investees
Omidyar Network invested in the microfinance sector, including Unitus Inc.

In 2009, the Omidyar Network donated $2 million over two years to the Wikimedia Foundation, and at the same time, Matt Halprin of Omidyar Network was appointed to Wikimedia's board of directors.

From 2012, Omidyar Network has been a partner of Better Than Cash Alliance.

In 2017, Omidyar Network together with AVINA Americas and Avina Foundation founded the  Latin American Alliance for Civic Technology (ALTEC) to invest in and support the development in Latin America of civic technology platforms and related scalable technologies.

In 2020, it invested $150,000 in the legal assistance organization Whistleblower Aid.

See also

 Acumen Fund
 Bill and Melinda Gates Foundation
 Blue Haven Initiative
 Jasmine Social Investments
 Mulago Foundation
 Peery Foundation
Philanthrocapitalism
 Skoll Foundation

References

External links

The Omidyar Group

Foundations based in the United States
2004 establishments in California